Le Multiconcessionnaire de Saint-Félicien-Dolbeau-Mistassini were a Junior "A" ice hockey team from Saint-Félicien, Quebec, Canada.  They are a part of the Quebec Junior AAA Hockey League.

History
The Multiconcessionnaire were founded in 2005.  They did not make the playoffs in their first season, but were looking to improve in 2006-07.

The Multiconcessionnaire announced in the Summer of 2009 that they will permanently cease operation.  It is unclear whether the franchise will be sold or remain dormant.

Season-by-Season record
Note: GP = Games Played, W = Wins, L = Losses, T = Ties, OTL = Overtime Losses, GF = Goals for, GA = Goals against

External links
Multiconcessionnaire Webpage

Ligue de Hockey Junior AAA Quebec teams
Saint-Félicien, Quebec